Ramal do Seixal is a closed railway branch, which connected the stations of Barreioro-A and Seixal, in Portugal. It was opened on 29 July 1923 and closed in 1969.

See also 
 List of railway lines in Portugal
 History of rail transport in Portugal

References

Sources
 

Iberian gauge railways
Sei
Railway lines opened in 1923
Railway lines closed in 1969